Breznița-Motru is a commune located in Mehedinți County, Romania. It is composed of seven villages: Breznița-Motru, Cosovăț, Deleni, Făuroaia, Plai, Tălăpanu and Valea Teiului. It is situated in the historical region of Oltenia.

References

Communes in Mehedinți County
Localities in Oltenia